Balapur may refer to any of the following places in India:

 Balapur, Akola district, Maharashtra
 Balapur (Vidhan Sabha constituency)
 Balapur Fort
 Balapur, Hyderabad, Telangana
 Balapur, Vikramgad, in Palghar district of Maharashtra